Bothrops taeniatus, the speckled forest-pitviper, is a species of pit viper found in the equatorial forests of South America endemic to Colombia, Ecuador, Peru, And Brazil. The specific name, taenia, is derived from the Greek word, tainia, meaning ribbon bandage or stripe, in reference to the slender body. Two subspecies are currently recognized, including the nominate subspecies described here.

Description

The body is relatively slender with a prehensile tail. The color pattern is extremely complex, varying overall from lavender gray to yellow green, while juveniles undergo considerable ontogenetic color change as they mature into adults.

It is distinguished from other members of this genus by having mostly single subcaudal scales and a row of bold white spots where the dorsal and ventral scales meet.

Geographic range
Widespread in the equatorial forests of South America in Ecuador, Colombia, Venezuela, Guyana, Suriname, French Guiana, Brazil, Peru, and Bolivia. The type locality given is "flumen Amazonum", which according to Vanzolini (1981) refers to the section of the Amazon River between the mouth of the Tajapuru river (01°02'S, 51°02'W) and the mouth of the Negros river (03°08'S, 59°55'W).

Habitat
This arboreal snake inhabits rainforests in lowlands and foothills, as well as moist tropical forests. It is usually found in vines and low vegetation in primary forest and along forest edges. It is suspected of living mainly in the forest canopy.

Venom
Only two cases of bites from this species have been documented, and both involved severe local swelling of the entire bitten limb. In the second case, the tissue damage was so severe that it led to amputation of the afflicted limb despite antivenin treatment.

Subspecies

References

 
 https://www.iucnredlist.org/species/15203757/15203769

taeniatus
Snakes of South America
Reptiles of Bolivia
Reptiles of Brazil
Reptiles of Colombia
Reptiles of Ecuador
Reptiles of French Guiana
Reptiles of Guyana
Reptiles of Peru
Reptiles of Suriname
Reptiles of Venezuela
Reptiles described in 1824
Taxa named by Johann Georg Wagler